Ideal Industries is an American company that produces connectors, hand tools, testers, and meters for the electrical and telecommunications industries.

The company manufactures many of its products in the United States. It also owns Western Forge and Pratt-Read, the largest– and second-largest American-made producers of screwdrivers respectively at the time of their acquisitions.

It is a competitor to Klein Tools, and its tools are sold at Lowe's and Ace Hardware stores as well as many independent distributors.

History 

Ideal was founded in 1916 by J. Walter Becker as the Ideal Commutator Dresser Company in Chicago, Illinois, manufacturing commutator dresser stones. In 1924, Becker relocated the company to its current location in Sycamore, Illinois. By 1949, it had become the United States' leading producer of wire nuts.

In 2010, Ideal acquired three American hand tool manufacturers: Western Forge in January, Pratt-Read in March, and SK Hand Tools in August.

Gallery

IDEAL Subsidiaries 

 Anderson Power Products
 Cree Lighting (formerly a segment of Wolfspeed)
 Enatel
 Lacelok
 Power Puck

 Pratt-Read Tools
Former Subsidiaries
 CMD
 Casella
 SK Hand Tools
 Western Forge

IDEAL - NIU Intrapreneurship Program 

In partnership with Northern Illinois University, IDEAL created a start-up incubator space adjacent to a manufacturing facility. The incubator houses several aspiring start-up teams initially composed of NIU students who have 24-hour access to the facility. Upon the students' graduation, they can obtain a full-time position within the company. Each team has a multi-disciplined background and has access to corporate IDEAL's resources while remaining independent enough to foster creative thinking. The program began to take shape in 2016 with two teams and has now grown to four units as of summer 2018. Each team is given an initial problem statement that will be researched and developed into a product or service which will then grow into a new business unit for the company.

References

External links 
Ideal Industries web site
Ideal Industries Networks web site

 
Electrical tool manufacturers
Tool manufacturing companies of the United States
Electrical wiring and construction supplies manufacturers
Manufacturing companies established in 1916
Privately held companies based in Illinois
Companies based in DeKalb County, Illinois